DD Uttarakhand is a state-owned TV channel telecasting from Doordarshan Kendra Uttarakhand, India. It was inaugurated by Venkaiah Naidu. The first news bulletin of DD Uttarakhand was read by Ms. Shikha Tyagi.

See also
 List of programs broadcast by DD National
 All India Radio
 Ministry of Information and Broadcasting
 DD Direct Plus
 List of South Asian television channels by country

Uttarakhand
Foreign television channels broadcasting in the United Kingdom
Television channels and stations established in 1992
Indian direct broadcast satellite services
Doordarshan